Administrative reform in Estonia was administrative reform which took place in 2017 and resulting in new administrative units in Estonia. In general, old units incorporated voluntarily, but in some cases incorporations were forced by state powers. After the reform, there are 79 administrative units (before 2017 there were 213): 15 urban and 64 rural municipalities. 185 municipalities merged to form 51 new ones, and 28 municipalities did not merge.

Old and new administrative units 

*Plus Võtikvere village from Torma Parish.

References

Geography of Estonia
Politics of Estonia
2017 in Estonia
Reform in Estonia